The following is a comprehensive list of awards and nominations received by Ricky Martin, a Puerto Rican singer, actor and author. By 2019, Martin had sold over 95 million albums, making him one of the best-selling Latin music artists of all time. Martin has received 228 awards from 526 nominations.

ABC Radio Music Awards
{|class="wikitable"
|-
!Year
!Nominee / work
!Award
!Result
!
|-
| 2000
|Ricky Martin
|Most Requested Artist
|
|style="text-align:center;"|
|-

ALMA Awards
The American Latino Media Arts Award, or ALMA Awards is a distinction awarded to Latino performers who promote positive portrayals of Latinos in the entertainment field.
{|class="wikitable"
|-
!Year
!Nominee / work
!Award
!Result
!
|-
|rowspan=2| 2000
|Ricky Martin
|Special Achievement, Male Entertainer of the Year
|
|rowspan="2" style="text-align:center;"|
|-
|"Livin' la Vida Loca"
|Outstanding Music Video
|
|-
|2001
|Livin' la Vida Loca Tour
| Best Tour
|
|rowspan="5" style="text-align:center;"|
|-
|rowspan=4|2002
|2001 Blockbuster Entertainment Awards
|Outstanding Performance in a Music, Variety or Comedy Special
|
|-
|rowspan=2|Ricky Martin
|National Council of La Raza Vanguard Award 
|
|-
|Outstanding Male Performer
|
|-
|"Nobody Wants To Be Lonely" (with Christina Aguilera)
|Outstanding Music Video 
|
|-
|2011
|rowspan=2|Ricky Martin
|rowspan=2|Favorite Male Music Artist
|
|style="text-align:center;"|
|-
|2012
|
|style="text-align:center;"|
|-

American Film Institute Awards
Each year the AFI Awards honor the ten outstanding films ("Movies of the Year") and ten outstanding television programs ("TV Programs of the Year"). The awards are a non-competitive acknowledgement of excellence.
{|class="wikitable"
|-
!Year
!Nominee / work
!Award
!Result
!
|-
|rowspan=1|2019
|The Assassination of Gianee Versace: American Crime Story
|TV Programs of the Year
|
|style="text-align:center;"|
|-

American Music Awards
The American Music Awards is an annual awards ceremony created by Dick Clark in 1973.
{|class="wikitable"
|-
!Year
!Nominee / work
!Award
!Result
!
|-
|1999
|rowspan=5| Ricky Martin
|Favorite Latin Artist
|
|style="text-align:center;"|
|-
|rowspan=2|2000
|Favorite Pop/Rock Male Artist
|
|rowspan="2" style="text-align:center;"|
|-
|rowspan=3|Favorite Latin Artist
|
|-
|rowspan=1|2003
|
|style="text-align:center;"|
|-
|rowspan="1"|2015
|
|style="text-align:center;"|
|-

amfAR Gala
{|class="wikitable"
|-
!Year
!Nominee / work
!Award
!Result
!
|-
|2010
|rowspan=1|Ricky Martin
|the Award of Inspiration
|
|style="text-align:center;"|
|-

ARTISTdirect Online Music Awards
{|class="wikitable"
|-
!Year
!Nominee / work
!Award
!Result
!
|-
|rowspan=2|2000
|rowspan=2|Ricky Martin
|Favorite Male Artist
|
|rowspan="2" style="text-align:center;"|
|-
|Sexiest Male 
|
|-

ASCAP Latin Awards
The American Society of Composers, Authors and Publishers (ASCAP) is a not-for-profit performance rights organization that protects its members' musical copyrights by monitoring public performances of their music, whether via a broadcast or live performance, and compensating them accordingly.
{|class="wikitable"
|-
!Year
!Nominee / work
!Award
!Result
!
|-
|rowspan=3|2000
|rowspan="2"|"Livin' La Vida Loca"
|Song of the Year
|
|rowspan="3" style="text-align:center;"|
|-
|rowspan=2|Pop/Ballad Winning Song
|
|-
|"Bella"
|
|-
|rowspan=1|2004
|"Tal Vez"
|rowspan=2| Song of the Year
|
|style="text-align:center;"|
|-
|rowspan=2|2005
|rowspan="2"|"Y Todo Queda en Nada"
|
|rowspan="2" style="text-align:center;"|
|-
|Pop/Ballad Winning Song
|
|-
|rowspan=3|2008
|rowspan="2"|"Tu Recuerdo" (feat La Mari of Chambao and Tommy Torres)
|Song of the Year
|
|rowspan="3" style="text-align:center;"|
|-
|rowspan=2|Pop/Ballad Winning Song
|
|-
|"Pégate"
|
|-
|rowspan=1|2012
|"Lo Mejor de Mi Vida Eres Tú" (feat Natalia Jiménez)
|rowspan=8|Pop Winning Song
|
|style="text-align:center;"|
|-
|rowspan=2|2014
|"Come with Me"
|
|rowspan="2" style="text-align:center;"|
|-
|"Más y Más" (Draco Rosa feat Ricky Martin)
|
|-
|rowspan=1|2015
|"Adrenalina" (Wisin feat Ricky Martin and Jennifer Lopez)
|
|style="text-align:center;"|
|-
|rowspan=2|2016
|"Disparo al Corazón"
|
|rowspan="2" style="text-align:center;"|
|-
|"La Mordidita" (feat Yotuel)
|
|-
|rowspan=2|2017
|"Perdóname"
|
|rowspan="2" style="text-align:center;"|
|-
|"Vente Pa' Ca" (feat Maluma)
|
|-
| rowspan=1|2019
|"Fiebre" (feat Wisin & Yandel)
|rowspan=2|Winning Song
|
|style="text-align:center;"|
|-
| rowspan=1|2022
|"Canción Bonita" (with Carlos Vives)
|
|style="text-align:center;"|
|-

Astaire Awards 
The awards honor excellence in dance and choreography on both stage and screen & now, the Fred and Adele Astaire Awards have been rebranded to celebrate the legacy of Broadway legend Chita Rivera.
{|class="wikitable"
|-
!Year
!Nominee / work
!Award
!Result
!
|-
|rowspan=1|2012
|Evita
|Outstanding Male Dancer in a Broadway Musical
|
|style="text-align:center;"|
|-

Attitude Awards 
The Attitude Awards is sponsored by Attitude Magazine.
{|class="wikitable"
|-
!Year
!Nominee / work
!Award
!Result
!
|-
|rowspan=1|2018
|Ricky Martin
|Attitude Legend Award
|
|style="text-align:center;"|
|-

Billboard Music Awards
The Billboard Music Awards are sponsored by Billboard magazine. The awards are based on sales data by Nielsen SoundScan and radio information by Nielsen Broadcast Data Systems.
{|class="wikitable"
|-
!Year
!Nominee / work
!Award
!Result
!
|-
| rowspan=1|1993
| rowspan=3|Ricky Martin
|Top New Latin Artist, Male
|
|style="text-align:center;"|
|-
| rowspan=2|1999
|Male Artist of the Year
|
| rowspan="2" style="text-align:center;"|
|-
| Hot 100 Singles Male Artist of the Year 
|
|-
|2022
|Enrique Iglesias and Ricky Martin Live in Concert
|Top Latin Tour
|
|style="text-align:center;"|
|-

Billboard Music Video Awards
{|class="wikitable"
|-
!Year
!Nominee / work
!Award
!Result
!
|-
|rowspan=3|1999
|rowspan="2"|"Livin' La Vida Loca"
|Maximum Vision Award
|
| rowspan="3" style="text-align:center;"|
|-
|Best New Artist Clip — Dance
|
|-
|"She's All I Ever Had" 
|Best New Artist Clip — Jazz/AC
|
|-
|rowspan=1|2001
|"She Bangs" 
|Best Clip of the Year — Latin
|
|style="text-align:center;"|
|-

Billboard Latin Music Awards
The Billboard Latin Music Awards is the offshoot of the Billboard Music Awards program from Billboard Magazine, an industry publication charting the sales and radio airplay success of musical recordings.
{|class="wikitable"
|-
!Year
!Nominee / work
!Award
!Result
!
|-
|rowspan="5"|1999
|rowspan="2"|"Vuelve"
|Hot Latin Track of the Year
|
|rowspan="5" style="text-align:center;"|
|-
|Latin Pop Track of the Year
|
|-
|Vuelve
|Pop Album of the Year, Male
|
|-
|Ricky Martin
|Hot Latin Tracks Artist of the Year
|
|-
|"La Copa de la Vida"
|Latin Dance Maxi-Single of the Year
|
|-
|rowspan="5"|2000
|rowspan="2"|"Livin' La Vida Loca"
|Hot Latin Track of the Year 
|
|rowspan="5" style="text-align:center;" |
|-
|rowspan=2|Latin Pop Track of the Year 
|
|-
|"Bella"  
|
|-
|rowspan="2"| Ricky Martin
|The Billboard Latin 50 Artist of the Year
|
|-
|Hot Latin Tracks Artist of the Year
|
|-
|2001
|"Shake Your Bon-Bon"
|Latin Dance Maxi-Single of the Year
|
|style="text-align:center;"|
|-
|rowspan="3"|2002
| Ricky Martin
|Spirit of Hope Award
|
|rowspan="3" style="text-align:center;"|
|-
|La Historia
|Latin Greatest Hits Album of the Year
|
|-
|"Loaded"
|Latin Dance Maxi-Single of the Year
|
|-
|2003
|rowspan=2| Ricky Martin
|Star Award
|
|style="text-align:center;"|
|-
|rowspan="5"|2004
|Hot Latin Tracks Artist of the Year
|
|rowspan="5" style="text-align:center;"|
|-
|rowspan=2|"Tal Vez"
|Hot Latin Track of the Year
|
|-
|Latin Pop Airplay Track of the Year, Male 
|
|-
|Almas Del Silencio
|Latin Pop Album of the Year, Male
|
|-
|"Jaleo" (Roger Sanchez Remix)
|rowspan=2|Latin Dance Club Play Track of the Year 
|
|-
|rowspan="1"|2006
|"I Don't Care/Que Más Dá" (Dance Remixes)
|
|style="text-align:center;"|
|-
|rowspan="3"|2007
|rowspan=2|"Tu Recuerdo" (feat La Mari of Chambao)
|Hot Latin Songs of the Year, Vocal Duet or Collaboration 
|
|rowspan="3" style="text-align:center;"|
|-
|Latin Pop Airplay Song of the Year, Duo or Group
|
|-
|MTV Unplugged 
|Latin Pop Album of the Year, Male 
|
|-
|rowspan="1"|2008
| Ricky Martin
|Latin Tour of the Year
|
|style="text-align:center;"|
|-
|rowspan="3"|2012
|Música + Alma + Sexo
|Latin Pop Album of the Year
|
|rowspan="3" style="text-align:center;"|
|-
|rowspan="3"| Ricky Martin
|Latin Pop Albums Artist of the Year, Solo
|
|-
|Latin Touring Artist of the Year
|
|-
|rowspan="2"|2015
|Latin Pop Songs Artist of the Year, Solo
|
|rowspan="2" style="text-align:center;"|
|-
|"Adrenalina" (Wisin feat Ricky Martin and Jennifer Lopez)
|Latin Rhythm Song of the Year
|
|-
|rowspan="6"|2016
|rowspan=2|A Quien Quiera Escuchar
|Top Latin Album of the Year 
|
|rowspan="6" style="text-align:center;"|
|-
|Latin Pop Album of the Year
|
|-
|rowspan=3| Ricky Martin
|Top Latin Albums Artist of the Year, Male
|
|-
|Latin Pop Albums Artist of the Year, Solo
|
|-
|Latin Pop Songs Artist of the Year, Solo
|
|-
|"La Mordidita" (feat Yotuel)
|Latin Pop Song of the Year
|
|-
|rowspan="1"|2017
|Ricky Martin
|Latin Pop Songs Artist of the Year, Solo
|
|style="text-align:center;"|
|-
|rowspan="1"|2022
|Enrique Iglesias and Ricky Martin Live in Concert
|Tour of the Year
|
|style="text-align:center;"|
|-

Billboard Online Poll
{|class="wikitable"
|-
!Year
!Nominee / work
!Award
!Result
!
|-
|rowspan=2|2000
|rowspan=2|"Livin' la Vida Loca"
|Song of the Year
|
|rowspan="2" style="text-align:center;"|
|-
|Record of the Year
|
|-

Blockbuster Entertainment Awards
The Blockbuster Entertainment Awards were a film awards ceremony, founded by Blockbuster Inc., that ran from 1995 until 2001.
{|class="wikitable"
|-
!Year
!Nominee / work
!Award
!Result
!
|-
|rowspan=1|1999 
|rowspan="2"|Ricky Martin
| Favorite Latino Artist
| 
|style="text-align:center;"|
|-
|rowspan="2"|2000 
| Favorite Pop Male Artist 
| 
|rowspan="2" style="text-align:center;"|
|-
|rowspan="1"| Ricky Martin
| Favorite CD
| 
|-
|rowspan="3"|2001 
|rowspan="3"| Ricky Martin
| Favorite Male Artist
| 
|rowspan="3" style="text-align:center;"|
|-
| Favorite Latino Artist
| 
|-
| Favorite Pop Male Artist 
|
|-

BMI Music Awards 
Broadcast Music, Inc. (BMI) is one of three United States performing rights organizations, along with ASCAP and SESAC. It collects license fees on behalf of songwriters, composers, and music publishers and distributes them as royalties to those members whose works have been performed.

BMI Latin Awards
{|class="wikitable"
|-
!Year
!Nominee / work
!Award
!Result
!
|-
| rowspan=1|1997
|"María"
| rowspan=2|Winning Songs
|
|style="text-align:center;"|
|-
| rowspan=1|1999
|"La Copa de la Vida"
|
|style="text-align:center;"|
|-
| rowspan=3|2000
|rowspan="2"|"Livin' la Vida Loca"
|Song of the Year
|
| rowspan="3" style="text-align:center;"|
|-
|rowspan="7"|Winning Songs
|
|-
|"Perdido Sin Ti"
|
|-
|rowspan=1|2001
|"Bella" 
|
|style="text-align:center;"|
|-
| rowspan=2|2005
|"Jaleo"
|
| rowspan="2" style="text-align:center;"|
|-
|"Y Todo Queda en Nada"
|
|-
| rowspan=1|2008
|"Pégate" 
|
|style="text-align:center;"|
|-
| rowspan=1|2012
|"Lo Mejor de Mi Vida Eres Tú" (feat Natalia Jiménez)
|
|style="text-align:center;"|
|-
| rowspan=2|2015
|rowspan="2"|"Adrenalina" (Wisin feat Ricky Martin and Jennifer Lopez)
|Latin Publisher of the Year
|
| rowspan="2" style="text-align:center;"|
|-
|Award Winning Songs
|
|-
| rowspan=4|2016
|rowspan="2"|"Disparo al Corazón"
|Latin Publisher of the Year
|
| rowspan="4" style="text-align:center;"|
|-
|Award Winning Songs
|
|-
|rowspan="2"|"La Mordidita" (feat Yotuel)
|Latin Publisher of the Year
|
|-
|Award Winning Songs
|
|-
| rowspan=4|2017
|rowspan="2"|"Que Se Sienta El Deseo" (Wisin feat Ricky Martin)
|Latin Publisher of the Year
|
| rowspan="4" style="text-align:center;"|
|-
|Award Winning Songs
|
|-
|rowspan="2"|"Vente Pa' Ca" (feat Maluma)
|Latin Publisher of the Year
|
|-
|Award Winning Songs
|
|-

BMI Pop Awards 
{|class="wikitable"
|-
!Year
!Nominee / work
!Award
!Result
!
|-
| rowspan=1|2001
|"She's All I Ever Had" 
|rowspan="2"|Winning Songs
|
|style="text-align:center;"|
|-
| rowspan=1|2002
|"She Bangs" 
|
|style="text-align:center;"|
|-

BRIT Awards
The Brit Awards are the British Phonographic Industry's annual pop music awards.
{|class="wikitable"
|-
!Year
!Nominee / work
!Award
!Result
!
|-
|rowspan="1"|2000 
|rowspan=2|Himself
|rowspan="2"|International Male Solo Artist
|
|rowspan="2" style="text-align:center;" |
|-
|rowspan="1"|2001
|
|-

British LGBT Award
The British LGBT Awards is the United Kingdom's biggest and most publicised LGBT+ event celebrating individuals & organisations with outstanding commitment to the LGBT+ community.
{|class="wikitable"
|-
!Year
!Nominee / work
!Award
!Result
!
|-
|rowspan="1"|2018
|Himself
|International Icon Award
|
|style="text-align:center;"|
|-

China Music Awards 
{|class="wikitable"
|-
!Year
!Nominee / work
!Award
!Result
!
|-
|rowspan="1"|2014
|Himself
|The Most Influential International Artist
|
|style="text-align:center;"|
|-

Comet Awards
{|class="wikitable"
|-
!Year
!Nominee / work
!Award
!Result
!
|-
|rowspan="1"|2003
|"Jaleo"
|Best Video
|
|style="text-align:center;"|
|-

Drama Desk Award
{|class="wikitable"
|-
!Year
!Nominee / work
!Award
!Result
!
|-
|rowspan="1"|2012
|Evita
|Outstanding Actor in a Musical
|
|style="text-align:center;"|
|-

Drama League Award
{|class="wikitable"
|-
!Year
!Nominee / work
!Award
!Result
!
|-
|rowspan="1"|2012
|Evita
|Distinguished Performance Award
|
|style="text-align:center;"|
|-

Echo Awards
Echo Awards is a German music award granted every year by the Deutsche Phono-Akademie (an association of recording companies). Each year's winner is determined by the previous year's sales.
{|class="wikitable"
|-
!Year
!Nominee / work
!Award
!Result
!
|-
|2000
|Ricky Martin
|Best International Rock/Pop Album Male Artist 
|
|style="text-align:center;"|
|-

Emmy Awards
The Emmy Award, often referred to simply as the Emmy, recognizes excellence in the television industry, and corresponds to the Academy Award (for film), the Tony Award (for theatre), and the Grammy Award (for music).
{|class="wikitable"
|-
!Year
!Nominee / work
!Award
!Result
!
|-
| 2018
| The Assassination of Gianni Versace: American Crime Story
| Outstanding Supporting Actor in a Limited Series or Movie
| 
|style="text-align:center;"|
|-

Entertainment Weekly 
Entertainment Weekly is an American magazine, published by Time Inc., that covers film, television, music, Broadway theatre, books and popular culture.
{|class="wikitable"
|-
!Year
!Nominee / work
!Award
!Result
!
|-
|rowspan="1"|1999
|Ricky Martin
|Entertainer of the Year
|
|style="text-align:center;"|
|-

Fans' Choice Awards
{|class="wikitable"
|-
!Year
!Nominee / work
!Award
!Result
!
|-
|rowspan=3|2021
|rowspan="3"|Ricky Martin
|Male Pop Artist
|
| rowspan="3" style="text-align:center;"|
|-
|Latin Pop
|
|-
|Best Featuring Video - Male Artist
|
|-

FM DOS Awards
{|class="wikitable"
|-
!Year
!Nominee / work
!Award
!Result
!
|-
|2021
|Pausa
|Album of the Year
|
|style="text-align:center;"|
|-

Foundation for Social Change
{|class="wikitable"
|-
!Year
!Nominee / work
!Award
!Result
!
|-
|2011
|Ricky Martin
|Leader of Change Award
|
|style="text-align:center;"|
|-

Gardel Awards Argentina
{|class="wikitable"
|-
!Year
!Nominee / work
!Award
!Result
!
|-
|rowspan="2"| 2000 
|Ricky Martin
|Best Latin Artist (Male)
|
|rowspan="2" style="text-align:center;"|
|-
|Ricky Martin 
| Best Pop Album 
|
|-

GLAAD Media Awards 
The GLAAD Media Awards were created in 1990 by the Gay & Lesbian Alliance Against Defamation to "recognize and honor media for their fair, accurate and inclusive representations of the LGBT community and the issues that affect their lives. 
{|class="wikitable"
|-
!Year
!Nominee / work
!Award
!Result
!
|-
|rowspan="1"|2011
|Ricky Martin
|Vito Russo Award
|
|style="text-align:center;"|
|-
|rowspan="1"|2012
|Música + Alma + Sexo
|rowspan="2"|Outstanding Music Artist (Spanish Language categories)
|
|style="text-align:center;"|
|-
|rowspan="1"|2016
|A Quien Quiera Escuchar
|
|style="text-align:center;"|
|-
|rowspan="1"|2021
|Pausa
|Outstanding Music Artist
|
|style="text-align:center;"|
|-

Global Gift Awards 
The Global Gift Awards are special awards given to those who make a difference in the lives of many through their social responsibility, their personal work and their professional work. These people, because of their high social and professional status, have been able to altruistically dedicate their time and energy to helping those in need.
{|class="wikitable"
|-
!Year
!Nominee / work
!Award
!Result
!
|-
|2013
|rowspan=1|Ricky Martin
|Humanitarian Award
|
|style="text-align:center;"|
|-

Gold Derby Music Awards 
Gold Derby is an American awards prediction and entertainment news website, founded in 2000 by Tom O'Neil. The website began giving out their own awards, the Gold Derby Awards, for film and television in 2003, and for music in 2021.
{|class="wikitable"
|-
!Year
!Nominee / work
!Award
!Result
!
|-
|2021
|rowspan=1|Ricky Martin
|Latin Artist
|
|style="text-align:center;"|
|-

Goldene Kamera Awards
The Goldene Kamera is an annual German film and television award, awarded by the television magazine HÖRZU.
{|class="wikitable"
|-
!Year
!Nominee / work
!Award
!Result
!
|-
|2001
|rowspan=1|Ricky Martin
|Pop International
|
|style="text-align:center;"|
|-

Grammy Awards
The Grammy Awards are awarded annually by the National Academy of Recording Arts and Sciences in the United States. 
{|class="wikitable"
|-
!Year
!Nominee / work
!Award
!Result
!
|-
|align="center"|1999
|Vuelve 
|Best Latin Pop Performance
|
| rowspan="9" style="text-align:center;"|
|-
|rowspan="4" align="center"|2000
|rowspan="3"|"Livin' la Vida Loca"
|Record of the Year
|
|-
|Song of the Year
|
|-
|Best Male Pop Vocal Performance
|
|-
|-
|Ricky Martin 
|Best Pop Vocal Album
|
|-
| align="center"|2001
|"She Bangs"
|Best Male Pop Vocal Performance
|
|-
| align="center"|2002
|"Nobody Wants to Be Lonely" (with Christina Aguilera)
|Best Pop Collaboration with Vocals
|
|-
| align="center"|2016
|A Quien Quiera Escuchar (Deluxe Edition) 
|Best Latin Pop Album
|
|-
| align="center"|2021
|Pausa 
|Best Latin Pop or Urban Album
|
|-

Guinness World Records
{|class="wikitable"
|-
!Year
!Nominee / work
!Award
!Result
!
|-
|1999
|rowspan=1|(Un, Dos, Tres) María
|Biggest Latin Hit
|
|style="text-align:center;"|
|-

Heat Latin Music Awards
The Heat Latin Music Awards is an awards created in 2015 by the chain of HTV music, to reward the best of Latin music.
{|class="wikitable"
|-
!Year
!Nominee / work
!Award
!Result
!
|-
| rowspan=4|2015
| "Adrenalina" (Wisin feat Ricky Martin and Jennifer Lopez)
| Best Music Video
|
| rowspan="4" style="text-align:center;"|
|-
| rowspan=6| Ricky Martin
| Best Male Artist
|
|-
| Best Rock/Pop Artist
|
|-
|-
| Best Artist North
|
|-
| rowspan=3|2016
| Best Male Artist
|
| rowspan="3" style="text-align:center;"|
|-
| Best Rock/Pop Artist
|
|-
|-
| Best Artist North
|
|-

Hispanic Federation
{|class="wikitable"
|-
!Year
!Nominee / work
!Award
!Result
!
|-
|2018
|rowspan=1|Ricky Martin
|Humanitarian Award
|
|style="text-align:center;"|
|-

Hispanic Heritage Awards
The Hispanic Heritage Awards, founded in 1987 as part of the first Hispanic Heritage Month and hosted by over thirty-five national Hispanic organizations, which honor the contributions of Latinas/os in the fields of (alphabetically) arts, education, leadership, literature, math/science, and sports, as well as Vision and Lifetime Achievement Awards.
{|class="wikitable"
|-
!Year
!Nominee / work
!Award
!Result
!
|-
|rowspan="1"|2002
|Ricky Martin
|Honoree in Arts
|
|style="text-align:center;"|
|-

Hollywood Walk of Fame
The Hollywood Walk of Fame is a sidewalk along Hollywood Boulevard and Vine Street in Hollywood, Los Angeles, California, United States, that serves as an entertainment hall of fame. It is embedded with more than 2,000 five-pointed stars featuring the names of celebrities honored by the Hollywood Chamber of Commerce for their contributions to the entertainment industry.
{|class="wikitable"
|-
!Year
!Nominee / work
!Award
!Result
!
|-
|rowspan="1"|2007 
|rowspan="1"|Ricky Martin
| Recording (on 16 October; At 6901 Hollywood Blvd.) 
|
|style="text-align:center;"|
|-

Hong Kong Top Sales Music Awards 
The Hong Kong Top Sales Music Awards is an annual award ceremony held by the International Federation of the Phonographic Industry Hong Kong (IFPIHK) since 2001 to honor every year best-selling music artists.
{|class="wikitable"
|-
!Year
!Nominee / work
!Award
!Result
!
|-
|rowspan="1"| 2001
| Sound Loaded
| Top 10 Best Selling Foreign Albums 
| 
|style="text-align:center;"|
|-

HRC National Dinner 
The Human Rights Campaign is the leading national advocacy organization working for the equal rights of lesbian, gay, bisexual, transgender and queer Americans through education, research and political activities.
{|class="wikitable"
|-
!Year
!Nominee / work
!Award
!Result
!
|-
|rowspan="1"|2019
| Ricky Martin
| HRC National Visibility Award 
|
|style="text-align:center;"|
|-

iHeartRadio Fiesta Latina 
The iHeartRadio Fiesta Latina is a music festival sponsored by iHeartRadio.
{|class="wikitable"
|-
!Year
!Nominee / work
!Award
!Result
!
|-
|rowspan="1"|2017 
|Ricky Martin 
|Premio Corazón Latino Award
|
|style="text-align:center;"|
|-

Imagen Foundation Awards 
{|class="wikitable"
|-
!Year
!Nominee / work
!Award
!Result
!
|-
|rowspan="2"|2000
|rowspan="1"|Ricky Martin
| Lasting Image Award 
|
|style="text-align:center;"|
|-
|"She's All I Ever Had"
|Video of the Year 
|
|style="text-align:center;"|
|-

International Center for Missing and Exploited Children
{|class="wikitable"
|-
!Year
!Nominee / work
!Award
!Result
!
|-
|2005
|Ricky Martin
|International Humanitarian Award
|
|style="text-align:center;"|
|-

International Dance Music Awards
The International Dance Music Awards were established in 1985. It is a part of the Winter Music Conference, a weeklong electronic music event held annually.
{|class="wikitable"
|-
!Year
!Nominee / work
!Award
!Result
!
|-
|rowspan="1"|2000
|"Livin La Vida Loca"
|rowspan="2"|Best Latin 12"
|
|style="text-align:center;"|
|-
|rowspan="1"|2001
|"She Bangs"
|
|style="text-align:center;"|
|-
|rowspan="1"|2012
|"Frío" (feat Wisin & Yandel) 
|Best Latin/Reggaeton Track
|
|style="text-align:center;"|
|-
|rowspan="1"|2014
|"Come with Me"
|Best Latin Dance Track
|
|style="text-align:center;"|
|-
|rowspan="1"|2015
|"Adiós"
|Best Latin Dance Track
|
|style="text-align:center;"|
|-
|rowspan="1"|2016
|"La Mordidita" (feat Yotuel)
|Best Latin Dance Track
|
|style="text-align:center;"|
|-

International Peace Honors
{|class="wikitable"
|-
!Year
!Nominee / work
!Award
!Result
!
|-
|2021
|rowspan=1|Ricky Martin
|Agent of Change
|
|style="text-align:center;"|
|-

IFPI Platinum Europe Awards
The IFPI Platinum Europe Awards were founded in 1996 and are awarded in recognition of one million album retail sales across Europe.
{|class="wikitable"
|-
!Year
!Nominee / work
!Award
!Result
!
|-
| align="center" rowspan="2"| 1998
| A Medio Vivir 
| rowspan="4"| Platinum Europe Award
| 
| rowspan="4" style="text-align:center;"|
|-
| Vuelve
| 
|-
| align="center"| 1999
| Ricky Martin (2x)
| 
|-
| align="center"| 2000
| Sound Loaded
| 
|-

Japan Gold Disc Awards
The Japan Gold Disc Awards is a music award ceremony, held annually by the Recording Industry Association of Japan.
{|class="wikitable"
|-
!Year
!Nominee / work
!Award
!Result
!
|-
|align="center"| 2000
|Ricky Martin
|International Pop Album of the Year
|
|style="text-align:center;"|
|-

Juno Awards
The Juno Awards are presented annually to Canadian musical artists and bands to acknowledge their artistic and technical achievements in all aspects of music.

|-
|rowspan="2"| 2000 || Ricky Martin||Best Selling Album (Foreign or Domestic)||

Latin American Music Awards
The Latin American Music Awards (Latin AMAS) is an annual award presented by American television network Telemundo. It is the Spanish-language counterpart of the American Music Awards produced by the Dick Clark Productions.
{|class="wikitable"
|-
!Year
!Nominee / work
!Award
!Result
!
|-
|rowspan=3|2015
|A Quien Quiera Escuchar
|Album of the Year
|
|rowspan="3" style="text-align:center;"|
|-
|Ricky Martin
|Favorite Pop/Rock Male Artist
|
|-
|"La Mordidita" (feat Yotuel)
| Favorite Pop/Rock Song 
|
|-
|rowspan=1|2017
|"Vente Pa' Ca" (feat Maluma)
|Favorite Pop/Rock Song
|
|style="text-align:center;"|
|-
|rowspan=2|2021
|Ricky Martin
|Favorite Artist - Pop
|
|rowspan="2" style="text-align:center;"|
|-
|"Tiburones"
|Favorite Song - Pop
|
|-
|rowspan=2|2022
|Enrique Iglesias & Ricky Martin
|Tour of the Year
|
|rowspan="2" style="text-align:center;"|
|-
|Ricky Martin
|Favorite Social Artist
|
|-

Latin Grammy Awards
The Latin Grammy Awards are awarded annually in the United States since 2000 for outstanding contributions to Spanish language music.
{|class="wikitable"
|-
!Year
!Nominee / work
!Award
!Result
!
|-
|rowspan="2"|2000
|"Livin' La Vida Loca"
|Record of the Year
|
|rowspan="2" style="text-align:center;"|
|-
|"Bella"
|Best Male Pop Vocal Performance
|
|-
|2001
|"She Bangs"
|Best Short Form Music Video
|
|style="text-align:center;"|
|-
|2004
|Almas Del Silencio
|Best Male Pop Vocal Album
|
|style="text-align:center;"|
|-
|rowspan="4"|2007
|"Tu Recuerdo" (feat La Mari and Tommy Torres)
|Record of the Year
|
|rowspan="4" style="text-align:center;"|
|-
|rowspan="3"|MTV Unplugged
|Album of the Year
|
|-
|Best Male Pop Vocal Album
|
|-
|Best Long Form Music Video
|
|-
|rowspan="3"|2011
|rowspan=3|"Lo Mejor de Mi Vida Eres Tú" (feat Natalia Jiménez)
|Record of the Year
|
|rowspan="3" style="text-align:center;"|
|-
|Song of the Year
|
|-
|Best Short Form Music Video
|
|-
|2013
|"Más y Más" (with Draco Rosa)
|Record of the Year
|
|style="text-align:center;"|
|-
|rowspan="3"|2015
|rowspan=2|"Disparo al Corazón"
|Record of the Year
|
|rowspan="3" style="text-align:center;"|
|-
|Song of the Year
|
|-
|A Quien Quiera Escuchar
|Best Contemporary Pop Vocal Album
|
|-
|rowspan="2"|2017
|rowspan=2|"Vente Pa' Ca" (feat Maluma)
|Record of the Year
|
|rowspan="2" style="text-align:center;"|
|-
|Song of the Year
|
|-
|rowspan="3"|2020
|rowspan="2" |Pausa
|Album of the Year
|
|rowspan="3" style="text-align:center;"|
|-
|Best Pop Vocal Album
|
|-
|"Cántalo" (with Residente and Bad Bunny)
|Best Urban Fusion/Performance
|
|-
|rowspan="2"|2021
|rowspan=2|"Canción Bonita" (with Carlos Vives)
|Song of the Year
|
|rowspan=2|
|-
|Best Pop Song
|
|-
|rowspan="2"|2022
|rowspan=2|"A Veces Bien Y A Veces Mal" (with Reik)
|Song of the Year
|
|style="text-align:center;"|
|-

Latin Grammy Special Awards
{|class="wikitable"
|-
!Year
!Nominee / work
!Award
!Result
!
|-
|rowspan=1|2006 
|Ricky Martin
|Person of the Year 
|
|style="text-align:center;"|
|-

Latin Music Italian Awards
{|class="wikitable"
|-
!Year
!Nominee / work
!Award
!Result
!
|-
|rowspan=6|2015
|Ricky Martin
|Best Latin Male Artist of The Year
|
|rowspan="6" style="text-align:center;"|
|-
|rowspan=3|"La Mordidita" (feat Yotuel)
|Best Latin Song of The Year
|
|-
|Best Latin Male Video of The Year
|
|-
|Best Latin Tropical Song of The Year
|
|-
|A Quien Quiera Escuchar
|Best Latin Male Album of The Year
|
|-
|"Disparo al Corazón"
|My Favorite Lyrics
|
|-
|rowspan=6|2016
|rowspan=2|Ricky Martin
|Best Latin Male Artist of The Year
|
|rowspan="6" style="text-align:center;"|
|-
|Artist Saga
|
|-
|rowspan=3|"Vente Pa' Ca" (feat Maluma)
|Best Latin Song of The Year
|
|-
|Best Latin Male Video of The Year
|
|-
| Best Latin Collaboration of The Year
|
|-
|"Perdóname (Remix)"(feat. Farruko)
|Best Latin Remix of The Year
|
|-
|2020
|Ricky Martin
|Best Latin Artist Worldwide
|
|style="text-align:center;"|
|-

Latin VideoClip Awards 
{|class="wikitable"
|-
!Year
!Nominee / work
!Award
!Result
!
|-
|rowspan="3"|2019
|rowspan="3"|Fiebre (feat Wisin & Yandel)
|Best Tropical / Fusion Video
|
|rowspan="3" style="text-align:center;"|
|-
|Best Edition
|
|-
|Best Direction
|
|-

Latino Show Music Awards 
{|class="wikitable"
|-
!Year
!Nominee / work
!Award
!Result
!
|-
|2020
|Falta Amor (with Sebastián Yatra)
|Best Pop song
|
|style="text-align:center;"|
|-
|2021
|Ricky Martin
|Best Male Pop Artist
|
|style="text-align:center;"|
|-

LGBT Center Dinner 
{|class="wikitable"
|-
!Year
!Nominee / work
!Award
!Result
!
|-
|2018
|Ricky Martin
|Trailblazer Award
|
|style="text-align:center;"|
|-

LGBTQ Nation Heroes 
{|class="wikitable"
|-
!Year
!Nominee / work
!Award
!Result
!
|-
|2020
|Ricky Martin
|Celebrity Activist of the Year
|
|style="text-align:center;"|
|-

LOS40 Music Awards 
LOS40 Music Awards (formerly titled 'Premios 40 Principales') is an awards ceremony hosted annually by the Spanish radio channel Los 40 Principales.
{|class="wikitable"
|-
!Year
!Nominee / work
!Award
!Result
!
|-
|rowspan="2"|2008
|Ricky Martin
|Best International Artist or Group in the Spanish Language
|
|rowspan="2" style="text-align:center;"|
|-
|rowspan=1|"No Estamos Solos"(with Eros Ramazzotti)
|Best International Song in the Spanish Language
|
|-
|rowspan="1"|2011
|rowspan=3|Ricky Martin
|Best International Artist in the Spanish Language
|
|style="text-align:center;"|
|-
|rowspan="1"|2013
|rowspan=2|Best Latin Artist or Group
|
|style="text-align:center;"|
|-
|rowspan="2"|2014
|
|rowspan="2" style="text-align:center;"|
|-
|"Adrenalina" (Wisin feat Ricky Martin and Jennifer Lopez)
|Best Spanish Language Song
|
|-

Los Angeles LGBT Center 
{|class="wikitable"
|-
!Year
!Nominee / work
!Award
!Result
!
|-
|rowspan="1"|2018
|Ricky Martin
|Gala Vanguard Award
|
|style="text-align:center;"|
|-

Lunas del Auditorio
{|class="wikitable"
|-
!Year
!Nominee / work
!Award
!Result
!
|-
|2006
|rowspan="7"|Ricky Martin
|rowspan="7"|Best Spanish Pop
|
|style="text-align:center;"|
|-
|2007
|
|style="text-align:center;"|
|-
|2008
|
|style="text-align:center;"|
|-
|2011
|
|style="text-align:center;"|
|-
|2012
|
|style="text-align:center;"|
|-
|2015
|
|style="text-align:center;"|
|-
|2018
|
|style="text-align:center;"|
|-

Mnet Asian Music Awards
Mnet Asian Music Awards, otherwise abbreviated as MAMA, is an award show held by Mnet annually that credits South Korean artists, as well as foreign artists who have had an impact in the South Korean Music industry.
{|class="wikitable"
|-
!Year
!Nominee / work
!Award
!Result
!
|-
|1999
|Ricky Martin
|Best International Artist
| 
|style="text-align:center;"|
|-

MTV Awards

MTV Asia Awards
The MTV Asia Awards gives recognition and awards to Asian and international icons in achievement, cinema, fashion, humanitarian, and music.
{|class="wikitable"
|-
!Year
!Nominee / work
!Award
!Result
!
|-
|rowspan="1"|2002
|rowspan="3"|Ricky Martin
|rowspan="3"|Favorite Male Artist
|
|style="text-align:center;"|
|-
|rowspan="1"|2004
|
|style="text-align:center;"|
|-
|rowspan="1"|2006
|
|style="text-align:center;"|
|-

MTV Europe Music Award
The MTV Europe Music Awards were established in 1994 by MTV Networks Europe to celebrate the most popular music videos in Europe.
{|class="wikitable"
|-
!Year
!Nominee / work
!Award
!Result
!
|-
|1998
|rowspan=5|Ricky Martin
|rowspan=2|Best Male
|
|style="text-align:center;"|
|-
|rowspan="2"|1999
|
|rowspan="2" style="text-align:center;"|
|-
|Best Pop
|
|-
|2000
|rowspan=2|Best Male
|
|style="text-align:center;"|
|-
|rowspan="1"|2001
|
|style="text-align:center;"|
|-

MTV Latin America Awards
Los Premios MTV Latinoamérica is the Latin American version of the MTV Video Music Awards. They were established in 2002 to celebrate the top music videos of the year in Latin America and the world.
{|class="wikitable"
|-
!Year
!Nominee / work
!Award
!Result
!
|-
|rowspan="2"|2003
| rowspan="3"| Ricky Martin
|Best Solo Artist
|
|rowspan="2"|
|-
|Best Pop Artist
|
|-
|rowspan="1"|2006
|MTV Tr3́s Viewer's Choice Award
|
|
|-
|rowspan="1"|2007
|"Tu Recuerdo" (feat La Mari of Chambao)
|Song of the Year
|
|
|-

MTV Millennial Awards
The MTV Millennial Awards celebrates music, movies, TV, fashion and things that happen on social media.
{|class="wikitable"
|-
!Year
!Nominee / work
!Award
!Result
!
|-
| rowspan="1"|2017
|"Vente Pa' Ca"(feat Maluma)
| Best Party Anthem
|
|style="text-align:center;"|
|-

MTV Video Music Awards
The MTV Video Music Awards were established at the end of the summer of 1984 by MTV to celebrate the top music videos of the year.
{|class="wikitable"
|-
!Year
!Nominee / work
!Award
!Result
!
|-
|rowspan="9"|1999
|rowspan=9|"Livin' La Vida Loca"
|Video of the Year
|
| rowspan="9" style="text-align:center;"|
|-
|Best Male Video
|
|-
|Best Pop Video
|
|-
|Best Dance video
|
|-
|Best Choreography in a Video
|
|-
|Viewer's Choice Award
|
|-
|International Viewer's Choice — Latin America (North)
|
|-
|International Viewer's Choice — Latin America (South)
|
|-
|International Viewer's Choice — Russia
|
|-
|rowspan="2"|2000
|rowspan=2|"Shake Your Bon-Bon"
|Best Male Video
|
| rowspan="2" style="text-align:center;"|
|-
|Best Dance video
|
|-

Music Television Awards
{|class="wikitable"
|-
!Year
!Nominee / work
!Award
!Result
!
|-
|1998
|rowspan=3|Ricky Martin
|Best Male
|
|style="text-align:center;"|
|-
|rowspan="3"|1999
|Best Pop Act
|
|style="text-align:center;"|
|-
|Best Male
|
|style="text-align:center;"|
|-
|"Livin' la Vida Loca"
|Best Song
|
|style="text-align:center;"|
|-
|2000
|rowspan=2|Ricky Martin
|rowspan=2|Best Male
|
|style="text-align:center;"|
|-
|rowspan="2"|2001
|
|style="text-align:center;"|
|-
|"Nobody Wants To Be Lonely" (with Christina Aguilera)
|Best Collaboration
|
|style="text-align:center;"|
|-

MVPA Awards
{|class="wikitable"
|-
!Year
!Nominee / work
!Award
!Result
!
|-
|rowspan="2"|2000
|rowspan="2"|"Livin' la Vida Loca"
|Best Choreography
|
|rowspan="2" style="text-align:center;"|
|-
|Best Styling
|
|-

My VH1 Music Awards
The My VH1 Music Awards was an annual music award ceremony held by American television network VH1 held in both 2000 and 2001.
{|class="wikitable"
|-
!Year
!Nominee / work
!Award
!Result
!
|-
|rowspan=3|2000
|rowspan=3|Ricky Martin
|Man of the Year
|
|rowspan="3" style="text-align:center;"|
|-
|Best Stage Spectacle
|
|-
|Booty Shake
|
|-

NAACP Image Awards
{|class="wikitable"
|-
!Year
!Nominee / work
!Award
!Result
!
|-
|rowspan="1"|2021
|Jingle Jangle: A Christmas Journey
|Outstanding Ensemble Cast in a Motion Picture
|
|style="text-align:center;"|
|-

Nickelodeon Kids Choice Awards
The Nickelodeon Kids' Choice Awards is an annual awards show, that honors the year's biggest television, movie, and music acts, as voted by the people.
{|class="wikitable"
|-
!Year
!Nominee / work
!Award
!Result
!
|-
|rowspan="1"|2000
|rowspan=2|Ricky Martin
|rowspan=2|Favorite Male Singer
|
|style="text-align:center;"|
|-
|rowspan="1"|2001
|
|style="text-align:center;"|
|-

NRJ Music Awards 
The NRJ Music Awards, created in 2000 by the radio station NRJ in partnership with the television network TF1.

|-
|rowspan="1"|2001
|rowspan="2"|Ricky Martin
|rowspan="2"|International Male Artist of the Year
|
|-
|rowspan="1"|2007
|
|-

NRJ Radio Awards

|-
|rowspan="1"|2002
|Ricky Martin
| International Male Artist of the Year (Best Male artist) 
|
|-

OFTA Television Awards 
{|class="wikitable"
|-
!Year
!Nominee / work
!Award
!Result
!
|-
|rowspan="1"|1999
|The 41st Annual Grammy Awards
|Best Host or Performer of a Variety, Musical or Comedy Special
|
|style="text-align:center;"|
|-
|rowspan="1"|2018
|The Assassination of Gianee Versace: American Crime Story
|Best Supporting Actor in a Motion Picture or Limited Series
|
|style="text-align:center;"|
|-

Orchid Festival 
The International Orchid Festival was an international musical contest held annually in an interrupted manner in Venezuela from 1982 to 2012, it was produced and broadcast live by the Venevisión network.
{|class="wikitable"
|-
!Year
!Nominee / work
!Award
!Result
!
|-
|1992
|rowspan=1|Ricky Martin
|Silver Orchid
|
|style="text-align:center;"|
|-

Orgullosamente Latino Awards
Orgullosamente Latino Awards is the Latino awards organised by the Ritmoson Latino. The show has been held annually since 2004 and is voted on by the general public.
{|class="wikitable"
|-
!Year
!Nominee / work
!Award
!Result
!
|-
|2004
|rowspan="5"|Ricky Martin
|rowspan="2"|Latin Solo of the Year
|
|
|-
|2007
|
|
|-
|2008
|rowspan="4"|Latin Trajectory of the Year
|
|
|-
|2009
|
|
|-
|2010
|
|
|-

People's Choice Awards 
The People's Choice Awards is an awards show recognizing the people and the work of popular culture. The show has been held annually since 1975 and is voted on by the general public.

|-
|rowspan="1"|1999
|rowspan=3|Ricky Martin
| Favorite Male Performer 
|
|-
|rowspan="1"|2000
| Favorite Male Musical Performer 
|
|-
|rowspan="1"|2001
| Favorite Male Musical Performer 
|
|-
|rowspan="1"|2005
| "Livin' La Vida Loca" by (Antonio Banderas & Eddie Murphy)
| Favorite Remake 
|

Poder Business Awards

|-
|rowspan="1"|2013
| Ricky Martin
|Poder Social Leadership Awards
|
|-

Pollstar Awards
Pollstar is a trade publication for the concert industry. It gets its information primarily from the agents, managers and promoters who produce concerts.
{|class="wikitable"
|-
!Year
!Nominee / work
!Award
!Result
!
|-
|rowspan="1"|2021
| Ricky Martin
|Latin Touring Artist of the Decade
|
|style="text-align:center;"|
|-
|rowspan="1"|2022
|Enrique Iglesias and Ricky Martin Live in Concert
|Best Latin Tour
|
|style="text-align:center;"|
|-

Pop Corn Music Awards
The Greek Pop Corn Music Awards are a defunct awards ceremony that were the first official Greek music awards.,that ran from 1992 until 2001.
{|class="wikitable"
|-
!Year
!Nominee / work
!Award
!Result
!
|-
|rowspan="2"|1999
|Ricky Martin
|Best Male Artist, International
|
|rowspan="4" style="text-align:center;" |
|-
|Ricky Martin
|Best Album, International
|
|-
|rowspan="2"|2000
|rowspan=2|Ricky Martin
|Best Male Artist, International
|
|-
|Best Dance Act, International
|
|-

Premios Amigo
The Premios Amigo is a music award ceremony in Spain, presented annually by Productores de Música de España since 1997.

|-
|rowspan="1"|1997
| rowspan="2"| Ricky Martin
|Special Amigo Award
|
|-
| rowspan="1"|1999
|Best International Male Solo Artist
|
|-

Premios Cadena 100
{|class="wikitable"
|-
!Year
!Nominee / work
!Award
!Result
!
|-
|rowspan="1"|2015
| Ricky Martin
|Los Premios Número 1
|
|style="text-align:center;"|
|-

Premios de la Gente
The Premios de la Gente, also known as Ritmo Latino Music Awards, were created in 1999 to award Latin music based on fans votes.

|-
|rowspan="1"|2003
|"Tal Vez"
|Video of the Year
|
|-
|rowspan="1"|2007
|MTV Unplugged
|Album of the Year
|
|-

Premios Dial
{|class="wikitable"
|-
!Year
!Nominee / work
!Award
!Result
!
|-
|rowspan="1"|2011
|Ricky Martin
|Special Awards Cadena Dial
|
|style="text-align:center;"|
|-

Premios El Heraldo
{|class="wikitable"
|-
!Year
!Nominee / work
!Award
!Result
!
|-
|rowspan="1"|1992
|Más Que Alcanzar Una Estrella
|Best Male Performance
|
|style="text-align:center;"|
|-

Premios EñE de la música

|-
|rowspan="1"|2006
|"Tu Recuerdo" (feat La Mari of Chambao)
|Mejor Artista Solista Masculino De Habla Hispana
|
|-
|rowspan="1"|2008
|"No Estamos Solos" (with Eros Ramazzotti)
|Mejor Dúo o Colaboración De Habla Hispana
|
|-

Premios Eres

|-
|rowspan="1"|1990
|Mamá Ama el Rock
|Best Supporting Actor in Theatre
|
|-
| rowspan="1"|1992
| rowspan="4"|Ricky Martin
| rowspan="2"|Latin Artist of the Year
|
|-
| rowspan="1"|1996
|
|-
| rowspan="3"|1997
|Best Male Show
|
|-
|Latin Artist of the Year
|
|-
|"Fuego de Noche, Nieve de Día"
|Best Video of the Year
|
|-
|rowspan="3"|1998
| rowspan="4"|Ricky Martin
|Best Latin Artist
|
|-
|Best Image
|
|-
|Best Trayectory
|
|-
|rowspan="2"|1999
|Best Latin Artist
|
|-
|"La Bomba"
|Best Dance Song
|
|-
|rowspan="4"|2000
| rowspan="3"|Ricky Martin
|Best Image
|
|-
|Best Show
|
|-
|Best Record
|
|-
| "Livin' la Vida Loca"
|Best Song
|
|-
|rowspan="2"|2001
| rowspan="2"|Ricky Martin
|Best Male Artist
|
|-
|Sexiest Artist
|
|-

Premios Globo
{|class="wikitable"
|-
!Year
!Nominee / work
!Award
!Result
!
|-
|rowspan="3"|1999
|Ricky Martin
|Pop/Ballad Artist of the Year
|
|rowspan="3" style="text-align:center;"|
|-
|"Livin' la Vida Loca"
|Pop/Ballad Song of the Year
|
|-
|Ricky Martin
|Pop/Ballad Album of the Year
|
|-

Premios Juventud
Premios Juventud is an awards show for Spanish-speaking celebrities in the areas of film, music, sports, fashion, and pop culture, presented by the television network Univision.
{|class="wikitable"
|-
!Year
!Nominee / work
!Award
!Result
!
|-
|rowspan="9"|2004
|rowspan="5"| Ricky Martin
|He's Got Style
|
|rowspan="9" style="text-align:center;"|
|-
|He's So Hot! 
|
|-
|Best Moves
|
|-
|All Over the Dial
|
|-
|Paparazzi's Favorite Target 
|
|-
| "Livin' la Vida Loca"
|Best Re-Mix 
|
|- 
|"La Bomba"
|Party Starter 
|
|-
|Almas del silencio
|CD To Die For
|
|-
| Ricky Martin and Christina Aguilera
|Dynamic Duet
|
|-
| rowspan="1"|2006
|rowspan=4| Ricky Martin
|Best Moves 
|
|style="text-align:center;"|
|-
| rowspan="4"|2007
|My Idol Is .. 
|
| rowspan="4" style="text-align:center;"|
|-
|What a Hottie! 
|
|-
|My Favorite Concert
|
|-
| "Tu Recuerdo" (feat La Mari of Chambao)
|Best Ballad 
|
|-
| rowspan="5"|2008
| rowspan=8| Ricky Martin
| Best Moves
|
| rowspan="5" style="text-align:center;"|
|-
|Favorite Pop Star 
|
|-
|He's Got Style 
|
|-
|What a Hottie!
|
|-
|My Idol Is... 
|
|-
| rowspan="1" align="center"|2009
|Best Moves
|
|style="text-align:center;"|
|-
| rowspan="3" align="center"|2010
|Best Moves
|
| rowspan="3" style="text-align:center;"|
|-
|My Idol Is... 
|
|-
| "Somos el Mundo"
| The Perfect Combo
|
|-
| rowspan="7" align="center"|2011
| rowspan="3"| Ricky Martin
| Best Moves
|
| rowspan="7" style="text-align:center;"|
|-
| Favorite Pop Star
|
|-
| Síganme Los Buenos 
|
|-
| rowspan="3"|"Lo Mejor de Mi Vida Eres Tú" (feat Natalia Jiménez)
| The Perfect Combination
|
|-
| Catchiest Tune
|
|-
| My Favorite Video
|
|-
| Música + Alma + Sexo
| Your Favorite CD
|
|-
| rowspan="4" align="center"|2012
| rowspan="3"| Ricky Martin
| Best Moves
|
| rowspan="4" style="text-align:center;"|
|-
| Favorite Pop Artist
|
|-
| Síganme Los Buenos 
|
|-
| rowspan="1"|Música + Alma + Sexo World Tour
| My Favorite Concert
|
|-
| rowspan="4" align="center"|2013
| rowspan="2"| Ricky Martin
| Best Moves
|
| rowspan="4" style="text-align:center;"|
|-
| Síganme Los Buenos 
|
|-
| rowspan="2"|"Más y Más" (with Draco Rosa)
| The Perfect Combination
|
|-
| My Favorite Video
|
|-
| rowspan="1" align="center"|2014
| rowspan="1"|"Adrenalina" (Wisin feat Ricky Martin and Jennifer Lopez)
| The Perfect Combination
|
|style="text-align:center;"|
|-
| rowspan="1" align="center"|2015
| rowspan="1"| Ricky Martin
| My Pop/Rock Artist
|
|style="text-align:center;"|
|-
| rowspan="1" align="center"|2016
| rowspan="1"|One World Tour
| My Favorite Concert
|
|style="text-align:center;"|
|-
| rowspan="2" align="center"|2017
| rowspan="2"|"Vente Pa' Ca" (feat Maluma)
| The Perfect Combination
|
| rowspan="2" style="text-align:center;"|
|-
| Best Song For Singing
|
|-
| rowspan="1" align="center"|2019
| rowspan="2"| Ricky Martin
| High Fashion
|
|style="text-align:center;"|
|-
| rowspan="2"|2020
| Agent of Change Award
|
| rowspan="2" style="text-align:center;"|
|-
| "Tiburones"
| Video with a Purpose
|
|-
|2021
| Ricky Martin
| Ayudando A Sus Fans
|
|style="text-align:center;"|
|-
|2022
| "Canción Bonita" (with Carlos Vives)
| The Perfect Mix
|
|style="text-align:center;"|
|-

Premios Lo Mas
{|class="wikitable"
|-
!Year
!Nominee / work
!Award
!Result
!
|-
|rowspan="1"|2019
|Ricky Martin
|Latin Artist of the Decade
|
|style="text-align:center;"|
|-
|rowspan="2"|2020
|"Falta Amor" (with Sebastián Yatra)
|Pop Song of the Year (in Spanish)
|
|style="text-align:center;"|
|-
|Pausa
|Male Spanish Pop Album
|
|style="text-align:center;"|
|-
|rowspan="1"|2021
|Ricky Martin
|Legend Artist of the Year
|
|style="text-align:center;"|
|-

Premios Lo Nuestro
Premios Lo Nuestro is an awards show honoring the best of Latin music, presented by television network Univision.
{|class="wikitable"
|-
!Year
!Nominee / work
!Award
!Result
!
|-
|1992
| Ricky Martin
|Pop New Artist of the Year
|
|rowspan="32" style="text-align:center;"|
|-
|rowspan="1"|1996
|"Te Extraño, Te Olvido, Te Amo" 
|Video of the Year
|
|-
|rowspan="1"|1998
|Vuelve 
|Pop Album of the Year
|
|-
|rowspan="3"|1999
| rowspan="1"| Ricky Martin
|Male Pop Artist of the Year
|
|-
|"Vuelve" 
| rowspan="2"|Pop Song of the Year
|
|-
|"La Copa De La Vida"
|
|-
|rowspan="4"|2000
|Ricky Martin 
|Pop Album of the Year
|
|-
| Ricky Martin
|Male Pop Artist of the Year
|
|-
|"Livin' la Vida Loca" (Spanish Version)
|Pop Song of the Year
|
|-
|"Bella" 
|Video of the Year
|
|-
|rowspan="1"|2001
|"She Bangs" (Spanish Version)
|Video of the Year
|
|-
|rowspan="5"|2004
|Almas Del Silencio
|Pop Album of the Year
|
|-
|"Tal Vez"
|Pop Song of the Year
|
|-
|"Jaleo"
|Video of the Year
|
|-
| rowspan="3"| Ricky Martin
|Best Pop Male Artist
|
|-
|Premio Lo Nuestro a la Excelencia
|
|-
|rowspan="2"|2005
|Pop Male Artist 
|
|-
|"Y Todo Queda en Nada"
|Pop Song of the Year
|
|-
|rowspan="4"|2008
|MTV Unplugged
|Pop Album of the Year
|
|-
|"Tu Recuerdo" (feat La Mari of Chambao)
|Pop Song of the Year
|
|-
| rowspan="3"| Ricky Martin
| Pop Male Artist
|
|-
|Maximum Excellence Award
|
|-
|rowspan="1"|2011
|World Icon Award 
|
|-
|rowspan="4"|2012
|Música + Alma + Sexo
|Pop Album of the Year
|
|-
| rowspan="2"|"Lo Mejor de Mi Vida Eres Tú" (feat Natalia Jiménez)
|Pop Song of the Year
|
|-
| Collaboration of the Year
|
|-
| Ricky Martin
| Best Pop Male Artist
|
|-
|rowspan="1"|2014
|"Come with Me"
|Video of the Year
|
|-
|rowspan="4"|2015
| Ricky Martin
|Pop Male Artist of the Year
|
|-
| rowspan="3"|"Adrenalina" (Wisin feat Ricky Martin and Jennifer Lopez)
|Urban Song of the Year
|
|-
|Urban Collaboration of the Year
|
|-
| Video of the Year
|
|-
|rowspan="4"|2016
|A Quien Quiera Escuchar
|Pop/Rock Album of the Year
|
|rowspan="4" style="text-align:center;"|
|-
| Ricky Martin
|Pop/Rock Male Artist of the Year
|
|-
|"Disparo al Corazón"
|Pop/Rock Song of the Year
|
|-
|"La Mordidita" (feat Yotuel)
|Video of the Year
|
|-
|rowspan="1"|2017
|rowspan="2"| Ricky Martin
|Pop/Rock Male Artist of the Year
|
|style="text-align:center;"|
|-
|rowspan="3"|2019
|Pop/Rock Artist of the Year
|
|rowspan="3" style="text-align:center;"|
|-
|rowspan="2"|"Fiebre" (feat Wisin & Yandel)
|Pop/Rock Song of the Year
|
|-
|Pop/Rock Collaboration of the Year
|
|-
|rowspan="3"|2021
| Ricky Martin
|Pop Artist of the Year
|
|rowspan="3" style="text-align:center;"|
|-
|"Tiburones"
|Pop Song of the Year
|
|-
|Pausa
|Pop Album of the Year
|
|-
|rowspan="3"|2022
|rowspan=2|"Canción Bonita" (with Carlos Vives)
|The Perfect Mix Of The Year
|
|rowspan="3" style="text-align:center;"|
|-
|Collaboration Of The Year – Tropical
|
|-
|rowspan="2"|Ricky Martin
|Solo Artist of the Year – Pop
|
|-
|rowspan="4"|2023
|Male Artist of the Year – Pop
|
|rowspan="4" style="text-align:center;"|
|-
| rowspan="2"|"A Veces Bien Y A Veces Mal" (with Reik)
|Collaboration of the Year – Pop
|
|-
|Song of the Year – Pop/Ballad
|
|-
|Play
| Album of the Year – Pop
|
|-

Premios MUSA
{|class="wikitable"
|-
!Year
!Nominee / work
!Award
!Result
!
|-
| 2021
|"Qué Rico Fuera" (with Paloma Mami)
|International Collaboration of the Year
|
|style="text-align:center;"|
|-

Premios Nuestra Tierra
Premios Nuestra Tierra  is an annual awards show honouring the creativity and drive of Colombian artists since 2007.
{|class="wikitable"
|-
!Year
!Nominee / work
!Award
!Result
!
|-
|2022
|"Canción Bonita" (with Carlos Vives)
|Pop Song
|
|style="text-align:center;"|
|-

Premios Ondas
The Premios Ondas have been given since 1954 by Radio Barcelona, a subsidiary of Cadena SER, in recognition of professionals in the fields of radio and television broadcasting, the cinema, and the music industry.
{|class="wikitable"
|-
!Year
!Nominee / work
!Award
!Result
!
|-
|rowspan="1"|1996
|Ricky Martin
|Latin Artist Revelation
|
|style="text-align:center;"|
|-

Premios Oye!
Premios Oye! (Premio Nacional a la Música Grabada) are presented annually by the Academia Nacional de la Música en México for outstanding achievements in the Mexican record industry. 
{|class="wikitable"
|-
!Year
!Nominee / work
!Award
!Result
!
|-
|rowspan="1"|2012
|Ricky Martin
|Pop Male Solo Artist
|
|style="text-align:center;"|
|-

Premios People en Español
{|class="wikitable"
|-
!Year
!Nominee / work
!Award
!Result
!
|-
|rowspan="1"|2010
|Ricky Martin
|The Best Dress of the Year
|
|style="text-align:center;"|
|-
|rowspan="4"|2011
| Música + Alma + Sexo
|Best Album
|
|rowspan="4" style="text-align:center;"|
|-
|"Frío" (feat Wisin & Yandel) 
|Best Video of the Year
|
|-
|rowspan="5"|Ricky Martin
|Worst Dressed
|
|-
|Comeback of the Year 
|
|-
|rowspan="3"|2012
| King of "Twitter"
|
|rowspan="3" style="text-align:center;"|
|-
|King of "Facebook"
|
|-
|Best Male Singer
|
|-
|rowspan="2"|2013
|rowspan="2"|"Más y Más" (with Draco Rosa)
|Best Video of the Year
|
|rowspan="2" style="text-align:center;"|
|-
|Best Collaboration of the Year
|
|-

Premios Quiero 
{|class="wikitable"
|-
!Year
!Nominee / work
!Award
!Result
!
|-
|2011
| "Más"
| Video of the Year
| 
|style="text-align:center;"|
|-
|2014
| "Vida"
|rowspan="2"|Best Male Artist Video
| 
|style="text-align:center;"|
|-
|rowspan="3"|2015
|rowspan="3"|"La Mordidita" (feat Yotuel)
| 
|rowspan="3" style="text-align:center;"|
|-
| Video of the Year 
| 
|-
| Best Choreography
| 
|-
|rowspan="3"|2016
|"Que Se Sienta El Deseo" (Wisin feat Ricky Martin)
| Best Urban Video
| 
|rowspan="3" style="text-align:center;"|
|-
| "Perdóname"
|Best Melodic Video
| 
|-
|Ricky Martin
|Best Instagramer Musician
| 
|-
|2017
|"Vente Pa' Ca" (feat Maluma)
|rowspan="2"|Best Pop Video
| 
|style="text-align:center;"|
|-
|2018
|"Fiebre"
| 
|style="text-align:center;"|
|-
|rowspan="2"|2020
|"Tiburones"
| Best Melodic Video
| 
|rowspan="2" style="text-align:center;"|
|-
| "Falta Amor" (with Sebastián Yatra)
|Best Male Artist Video
| 
|-
|2021
|"Canción Bonita" (with Carlos Vives)
|Best Pop Video
| 
|style="text-align:center;"|
|-

Premios Tu Mundo
The Premios Tu Mundo (Spanish for "Your World Awards") is an annual award presented by American television network Telemundo. The awards celebrates the achievements of Hispanics and Latinos in the media including TV shows, movies, music, fashion, and sports.
{|class="wikitable"
|-
!Year
!Nominee / work
!Award
!Result
!
|-
| 2012
| Ricky Martin
| I'm Sexy and I Know It
| 
|style="text-align:center;"|
|-
|rowspan="3"|2014
| "Vida"
| Party Starter Song
| 
|rowspan="3" style="text-align:center;"|
|-
|"Adrenalina" (Wisin feat Ricky Martin and Jennifer Lopez)
| Most Popular Song of the Year 
| 
|-
|rowspan=2|Ricky Martin
| Social Sensation
| 
|-
| 2016
| Favorite Pop Artist
| 
|style="text-align:center;"|
|-

Premios Tú Música
{|class="wikitable"
|-
!Year
!Nominee / work
!Award
!Result
!
|-
|rowspan="1"|2001
|La Historia
|Best Special Recording
|
|rowspan="3" style="text-align:center;" |
|-
|rowspan="2"|2003
|Almas Del Silencio
|Best Ballad Album
|
|-
|"Tal Vez"
|Best Song
|
|-

Premios Tu Música Urbano
{|class="wikitable"
|-
!Year
!Nominee / work
!Award
!Result
!
|-
|rowspan="1"|2019
|"Fiebre" (feat Wisin & Yandel)
|Best Pop Urban Song
|
|style="text-align:center;"|
|-

Queerties
{|class="wikitable"
|-
!Year
!Nominee / work
!Award
!Result
!
|-
|rowspan="1"|2020 
|Ricky Martin
|Love Is Great
|
|style="text-align:center;"|
|-
|rowspan="1"|2021
|"Simple"
|Anthem
|
|style="text-align:center;"|
|-

Radio Music Awards

Ritmo Latino Music Awards

RTHK International Pop Poll Awards 
The RTHK International Pop Poll Awards are the Hong Kong music awards, organized by Radio Television Hong Kong (RTHK) to promote foreign pop.
{|class="wikitable"
|-
!Year
!Nominee / work
!Award
!Result
!
|-
|rowspan=1| 2002
|"Nobody Wants To Be Lonely" (with Christina Aguilera)
|Top Duet/Various
|style="text-align:center; background:#C0C0C0;"|Silver
|style="text-align:center;"|
|-

Singapore Radio Music Awards
{|class="wikitable"
|-
!Year
!Nominee / work
!Award
!Result
!
|-
|rowspan="1"|2000
|Ricky Martin
|Best Male
|
|style="text-align:center;"|
|-

Spotify Awards
{|class="wikitable"
|-
!Year
!Nominee / work
!Award
!Result
!
|-
|rowspan="1"|2020
|"No Se Me Quita" (Maluma feat Ricky Martin)
|Spotify Awards
|
|style="text-align:center;"|
|-

Soberano Awards
The Soberano Awards are the Dominican music awards, which are awarded annually by the Asociación de Cronistas de Arte of the Dominican Republic in Santo Domingo.
{|class="wikitable"
|-
!Year
!Nominee / work
!Award
!Result
!
|-
|align="center"|2006
|Ricky Martin
|International Soberano 
|
|style="text-align:center;"|
|-

Teen Choice Awards 
The Teen Choice Awards were established in 1999 to honor the year's biggest achievements in music, movies, sports and television, being voted by young people aged between 13 and 19.

Telehit Awards
Telehit Awards (Spanish: Premios Telehit) is a Mexican award that recognizes the greatest music events in Mexico, and broadcast by Telehit channel.
{|class="wikitable"
|-
!Year
!Nominee / work
!Award
!Result
!
|-
|2008
|rowspan=4| Ricky Martin
|Most Successful Latin Artist Worldwide
|
|style="text-align:center;"|
|-
|2010
|Most important Latin artist
|
|style="text-align:center;"|
|-
|2011
|Most important Latin artist in the world
|
|style="text-align:center;"|
|-
|2017
|Artist of the Decade Telehit Awards
|
|style="text-align:center;"|
|-

Viña Del Mar Festival 
The Viña del Mar International Song Festival is a music festival held annually during February since 1960 in Viña del Mar, Chile. It is considered the most important musical event in the Americas.
{|class="wikitable"
|-
!Year
!Nominee / work
!Award
!Result
!
|-
|rowspan="1"|1993
|rowspan="11"|Ricky Martin
|Silver Seagull
|
|style="text-align:center;"|
|-
|rowspan="4"|2007
|Silver Torch
|
|rowspan="4" style="text-align:center;"|
|-
|Golden Torch
|
|-
|Silver Seagull
|
|-
|Silver Seagull
|
|-
|rowspan="4"|2014
|Silver Torch
|
|rowspan="4" style="text-align:center;"|
|-
|Golden Torch
|
|-
|Silver Seagull
|
|-
|Golden Seagull
|
|-
|rowspan="2"|2020
|Silver Seagull
|
|rowspan="2" style="text-align:center;"|
|-
|Golden Seagull
|
|-

VH1/Vogue Fashion Awards

World Music Awards
The World Music Awards is an honor absolute international awards show founded in 1989 that annually honors recording artists based on worldwide sales figures provided by the International Federation of the Phonographic Industry (IFPI). 
{|class="wikitable"
|-
!Year
!Nominee / work
!Award
!Result
!
|-
| rowspan="2" align="center"|1999
| rowspan="10"| Ricky Martin
| World's Best - Selling Male Pop Artist
|
| rowspan="2" style="text-align:center;"|
|-
| World's Best - Selling Latin Artist
|
|-
| rowspan="3" align="center"|2000
| World's Best - Selling Male Pop Artist 
|
| rowspan="3" style="text-align:center;"|
|-
| World's Best - Selling Male Dance Artist
|
|-
| World's Best - Selling Latin Artist
|
|-
| rowspan="3" align="center"|2001
| World's Best - Selling Male Pop Artist
|
| rowspan="3" style="text-align:center;"|
|-
| World's Best - Selling Male Dance Artist
|
|-
| World's Best - Selling Male Latin Artist
|
|-
| rowspan="2" align="center"|2002
| World's Best - Selling Male Pop Artist 
|
| rowspan="2" style="text-align:center;" |
|-
| World's Best - Selling Male Latin Artist 
|
|-
| rowspan="6" align="center"|2014
| rowspan="2"|"Come with Me"
| World's Best Songs
|
| rowspan="6" style="text-align:center;"|
|-
| World's Best Video
|
|-
| rowspan="4"| Ricky Martin
| World's Best Male Artist
|
|-
| World's Best Entertainer
|
|-
| World's Best Live Act
|
|-
| Latin Legend Award
|
|-

World Summit of Nobel Peace Laureates 
{|class="wikitable"
|-
!Year
!Nominee / work
!Award
!Result
!
|-
|rowspan="1"|2019
|Ricky Martin
|Peace Summit Award
|
|style="text-align:center;"|
|-

Honours
Martin was chosen along with Félix Trinidad in 1999, to lead Puerto Rico's worldwide tourism campaign, both exemplifying Puerto Rico's youthfulness, enthusiasm and indefatigable character.
In February 2004, Martin received a Lifetime Achievement Award at the Lo Nuestro Awards in Miami.
Martin was honored as the 2006 Latin Recording Academy Person of the Year by the Latin Recording Academy on November 1, 2006. He was chosen for his accomplishments as a world-renowned entertainer, consummate performer and passionate humanitarian. A portion of the proceeds from the evening's tribute dinner was used for benefitting Ricky Martin's charitable efforts.
On October 16, 2007, Martin received the 2351st Hollywood Walk of Fame star,five days after receiving the key to the city of Miami Beach, Florida on October 11. The star is located beside the Hollywood and Highland complex. Los Angeles mayor Antonio Villaraigosa and Rita Moreno were invited to the unveiling ceremony.
In 2008, Puerto Rico declared August 31 to be International Ricky Martin Day.
In 2011, Martin was awarded Spanish citizenship to honor his contributions to the arts.
 In addition to the numerous awards received throughout his musical career, Martin has also been honored with many accolades for his humanitarian efforts.

References

Lists of awards received by Puerto Rican musician
Awards